The 1918 Dartmouth football team represented Dartmouth College in the 1918 college football season.

Schedule

References

Dartmouth
Dartmouth Big Green football seasons
Dartmouth football